Isha may refer to:

 Isha (Fantasy), the fictional deity from Warhammer Fantasy
 Isha Foundation, a non-profit organization founded by Sadhguru Jaggi Vasudev
 Isha prayer, the night-time daily prayer obligatory in Islam
 Isha Upanishad, the Hindu religious text
 International Students of History Association (ISHA)

Given name
 Isha Basant Joshi (1908-?), Indian author
 Isha Chawla (born 1988), Indian film actress
 Isha Datar (born 1988), Canadian biotechnologist
 Isha Johansen (born 1964), Sierra Leonean entrepreneur
 Isha Judd (born 1962), Australian writer
 Isha Khan Choudhury (born 1971), Indian politician
 Isha Koppikar (born 1976), Indian actress
 Isha Lakhani (born 1985), Indian tennis player
 Isha Rikhi (born 1993), Indian film actress
 Isha Sesay (born 1976), American journalist
 Isha Sharvani (born 1984), Indian dancer
 Isha Talwar (born 1987), Indian film actress

See also
 Ishvara, a concept in Hinduism
 Isa (disambiguation)